Bruce Feldman is an American racing driver from San Ramon, California. He won the 1988 Barber Saab Pro Series championship. He also competed in the 1992 Indy Lights season.

Racing career
Feldman Started racing in go karts at age 10 and that was followed by success in drag racing and solo contests.

After a career in SCCA Formula Ford and the Skip Barber Racing Series, Feldman debuted in the first ever Barber Saab Pro Series. Feldman won the sixth race of the 2006 season at Road America. He returned to the Saab powered championship in 1987. Winning three races the American ended up second in the standings. In his final season in the series Feldman won two races but as a result of strong point finishes he clinched the championship in the final round.

Following his championship win in 1989 he moved to the SCCA Corvette Challenge. Feldman was entered by David Lavertue in the #5 Chevrolet Corvette R7F in nine out of twelve rounds. The fast driver started second at the Des Moines Street Circuit but was crashed out of the race. His best results came at the Detroit Belle Isle Grand Prix and Mid-Ohio Sports Car Course where he finished eleventh.

In 1992 Feldman was signed by Leading Edge Motorsport to compete in the Indy Lights. He competed in four races in his Buick powered March Wildcat. His best result came at New Hampshire Motor Speedway, he finished eighth. Due to a lack of sponsorship his Indy Lights career was cut short.

In 2002 Feldman raced in the Formula Russell Series winning the Masters Championship, then came back in 2003 and won the overall USAC Russell Championship. In 2004 and 2005 he won races in abbreviated seasons of the Formula Russell Championship.

Racing record

American open–wheel racing results
(key)

Indy Lights

SCCA National Championship Runoffs

References

Racing drivers from California
People from San Ramon, California
Barber Pro Series drivers
Indy Lights drivers
Formula Ford drivers
Living people
SCCA National Championship Runoffs participants
Year of birth missing (living people)